Jocara rufitinctalis is a species of snout moth in the genus Jocara. It was described by George Hampson in 1906. It is found in Paraguay and Brazil.

References

Moths described in 1906
Jocara